A mycoparasite is an organism with the ability to parasitize fungi.

Mycoparasites might be biotrophic or necrotrophic, depending on the type of interaction with their host.

Types of mycoparasitic organisms

Myco-heterotrophy 
Various plants may be considered mycoparasites, in that they parasitize and acquire most of their nutrition from fungi during a part or all of their life cycle. These include many orchid seedlings, as well as some plants that lack chlorophyll such as Monotropa uniflora. Mycoparasitic plants are more precisely described as myco-heterotrophs.

Mycoparasitic bacteria 
Some bacteria live on or within fungal cells as parasites or symbionts.

Mycoparasitic viruses 
Some viruses, called mycoviruses live on or within fungal cells as parasites or symbionts.

Mycoparasitic fungi 
Many mycoparasites are fungi, though not all fungicolous fungi are parasites (some are commensals or saprobes.) Biotrophic mycoparasites acquire nutrients from living host cells. Necrotrophic mycoparasites rely on dead host cells, which they might first kill with toxins or enzymes (saprophytic growth).

Kinds of mycoparasitic interactions

Biotrophic and necrotrophic mycoparasites 
Biotrophic mycoparasites get nutrients from living host cells and growth of these parasites is greatly influenced by the metabolism of the host. Biotrophic mycoparasites tend to show high host specificity, and often form specialized infection structures. Necrotrophic mycoparasites can be aggressively antagonistic, invading the host fungus and killing, then digesting components of its cells. Necrotrophic parasites tend to have low host specificity, and are relatively unspecialized in their mechanism of parasitism.

Balanced and destructive mycoparasites 
Balanced mycoparasites have little or no destructive effect on the host, whereas destructive mycoparasites have the opposite effect. Biotrophic mycoparasites are generally considered to be balanced mycoparasites; necrotrophic mycoparasites use toxins or enzymes to kill host cells, therefore necrotrophic mycoparasites are usually considered to be destructive mycoparasites. However, in some combinations, the parasite may live during its early development as a biotroph, then kill its host and act more like destructive mycoparasites in late stages of parasitization.

Mechanisms of Mycoparasitism 
The four main steps of mycoparasitism include target location; recognition; contact and penetration; and nutrient acquisition.

Target location 
Many research indicate that hyphal growth direction, spore germination, and bud tube elongation of mycoparasitic fungi may exhibit tropism in response to detection of a potential host.  This tropic recognition reaction is thought to arise from detection of signature chemicals of the host; the direction of the concentration gradient determines the growth direction of the parasite. As the mycoparasitic interaction is host-specific and not merely a contact response, it is likely that signals from the host fungus are recognized by mycoparasites such as Trichoderma and provoke transcription of mycoparasitism-related genes.

Recognition 
When mycoparasites contact their fungal host, they will recognize each other. This recognition between mycoparasites and their host fungi may be related to the agglutinin on the cell surface of the mycohost. Carbohydrate residues on the cell wall of mycoparasites might bind to lectins on the surface of the host fungi to achieve mutual recognition.

Contact and penetration 
Once a mycoparasitic fungus and its host recognize each other, both may exhibit changes in external form and internal structure. Different mycoparasitic fungi form different structures when interacting with their hosts. For example, the hyphae of some mycoparasitic fungi form specialized contact cells resembling haustoria on the hyphae of their hosts; others may coil around the hyphae of their host fungus or penetrate then grow inside host hyphae. Nectrophic mycoparasites may kill host hyphae with toxins or enzymes before invading them.

Application 
Mycoparasitic fungi can be important controls of plant disease fungi in natural systems and in agriculture, and may play a role in integrated pest management (IPM) as biological controls 

Some Trichoderma species have been developed as biocontrols of a range of commercially important diseases, and have been applied in the United States, India, Israel, New Zealand, Sweden, and other countries to control plant diseases caused by Rhizoctonia solani, Botrytis cinerea, Sclerotium rolfsii, Sclerotinia sclerotiorum, Pythium spp., and Fusarium spp. as a promising alternative to chemical pesticides.

Further study of mycoparasitism may drive discovery off more bioactive compounds including biopesticides and biofertilizers.

References 

Parasites of fungi